Minembwe is a territory located in the high tropical mountains of Fizi territory, South Kivu, Democratic Republic of the Congo (DRC).

The Minembwe territory was predominantly inhabited by the Bembe and Buyu people, but there is a wide ethnocultural diversity within the region, and it is also a point of confluence for many ethnic groups, such as the Bafuliiru, Banyindu, Bamushi, Baholoholo, Babwari, Bavira, Balega, Bahunde, Banyanga, Bashu, Baamba, Baswaga, and Banyamulenge people. However, the Bembe people are the preponderance ethnic group in the area and are believed to be “indigenous.” Kibembe, a Bantu language, is the most widely spoken language in the Minembwe, followed by Swahili, which covers almost all the centers of the sectors. Other minority populations speak their own vernacular languages.

History 
Before its establishment as an independent territory in the Lulenge sector in the Fizi territory, the region was an ancient chiefdom of the Bembe people, a Bantu-speaking ethnic group who occupies a series of savanna plateaus spanning across the eastern part of the Democratic Republic of Congo and the western part of the Republic of Tanzania.

During Belgian colonization, the Babembe and Babuyu were grouped together in the Fizi Territory. The colonial administration subdivided the latter into five sectors, Itombwe, Lulenge, Mutambala, Ngandja, and Tanganyika. In the post-colonial era, the Itombwe sector was attached to Mwenga Territory to bring the administration closer to the citizens. Many sections of these regions were considered to be underpopulated in the 1920s; their development necessitated the importation of workers from elsewhere. It was in this context that people from Rwanda were transferred to the highlands of Kivu from the late 1930s to the 1950s. In other words, they were imported to suit colonial needs: to work in public services or on plantations run by white settlers and to assure the viability of local chieftaincies. In the late 1950s, there was a surge of Banyarwanda (a term commonly used to describe immigrants from Rwanda) into Fizi territory, particularly in the Lulenge sector. Moreover, during the Rwandan Revolution of 1959, the Rwandan refugees were settled in the sites of Lemera, Mulenge, and Katobo in 1959 by High Commissioner for Refugees (UNHCR). Incidentally, they dispersed all over the Lulenge sector to settle in the most inaccessible areas.  

The Banyarwanda who had settled in the Lulenge sector in the late 1950s-80s and those who migrated to the eastern part of the Congo Free State in the nineteenth century (now termed as “Banyamulenge”) wanted to establish autonomous territory. However, the requirements established by the Belgian colonial administration and maintained by the Congolese State after independence, all the tribes of the Democratic Republic of Congo, to exist and be recognized as a tribal or ethnic entity, must have a language that gives its name to the tribe, has a chieftainship that represents the tribe in relation to the other neighboring tribes and the Congolese State, and finally, have a defined territory whose borders are recognized by the neighboring tribes. The Banyarwanda, who had neither territory nor chieftainship, and who spoke Kinyarwanda as a mother tongue, were disqualified from being a Congolese tribe or acquiring land based on the determining three criteria. “Banyarwanda” or “Banyamulenge” name never appears in colonial records; throughout history, Banyarwanda were viewed as immigrants from Rwanda, and the Belgian colonists did not list them as an ethnic group until independence in 1960. Thus, in 1972, Barthélémy Bisengimana Rwema, a cabinet director of Mobutu Sese Seko during his second republic, initiated a presidential “Ordinance № 69-096” collectively granting the Zairian (Congolese) nationality to all Banyarwanda. This law complicate things, putting the Banyarwanda populations settled in the territory of the eastern part of the Democratic Republic of Congo before the Belgian Congo colony (therefore Congolese by right) and those coming from more recent migratory flows in the same situation, creating perplexity. The “mass” acquisition of Congolese nationality, coupled with the perverse effects of the land law promulgated within the framework of “Zairianisation”. Businessmen, politicians and Tutsi notables recovered land, in particular former colonial plantations, redistributed by the State. These land acquisitions conferred a legal character on the land settlements of the Tutsi peasantry in the Kivu.

The impossibility of applying the “1972 Ordinance”, not respecting the basic criterions, aggravated the tension and engendered conflicts in the region due to resistance from other Congolese tribes who considered themselves expropriated for the second time (the first time by the Belgian colonists) from part of their territory by Tutsis who remained from elsewhere in the collective unconscious. These ethnic tensions threatened the national integrity and led the Congolese political authorities to repeal and annul the “1972 Ordinance” by passing Law no. 81/002 of June 29, 1981, and, thus, to correct the mistake that was made to the law regarding the recognition of ethnic communities. In the same year, Banyarwanda changed their eponym from “Banyarwanda” to “Banyamulenge” to be distinguished from those coming directly from Rwanda. However, the identity crisis between Banyamulenge and other Congolese tribes was conspicuous at the time as civil status offices continued to be torched to destroy the administrative documents necessary for any granting of nationality or land for Banyamulenge.

Between 1991 and 1993, these ethnic tensions resurfaced violently, particularly on the background of the problem of representation of Kivu at the National Sovereign Conference (Conférence Nationale Souveraine) organized in Kinshasa to establish a democratic regime in Zaire. They will lead to the formation of youth militias initiating attacks and murders in Kivu. The tensions will require the intervention of the Special Presidential Division (Division Présidentielle Spéciale), an elite military corps of Mobutu’s regime, to restore some semblance of order.

In 1998, at the outset of the Second Congo War, there was a form of solidarity between Banyamulenge and Rwandan refugees who were present almost everywhere in the Kivu region. These groups had common adversaries in particular: Juvénal Habyarimana in Rwanda and then, to a certain extent, Mobutu in Zaire due to nationality and land laws. Banyamulenge’s fighters fought for the Rwandan Patriotic Front (RPF), then for the Alliance of Democratic Forces for the Liberation of Congo (AFDL) and the Rally for Congolese Democracy (Rassemblement Congolais pour la Démocratie). After Mobutu departed, the Rally for Congolese Democracy, a rebel group backed by the Rwandan government and led by Azarias Ruberwa at the time, created Minembwe as an independent territory in 1999 alongside Bunyakiri in Kalehe Territory. The creation of Minembwe territory responded to a long-standing wish of the Banyamulenge, to whom the colonial authorities and Zairean government had refused a chieftaincy or a group.

Tensions 
The recognition of these two territorial entities is a source of tension between the various components of the Transitional Government at the beginning of 2006.

Those on the Banyamulenge side believe that they were not given enough space within Fizi Territory and are therefore battling for self-defense. Because many Congolese Tutsis of Rwandan origin, especially Banyamulenge, cooperated with Rwandans, other Congolese sometimes perceive them as a separate group. Many ethnic groups of Minembwe, such as Babembe, Bafuliiru, Banyindu, Bamushi, and Barega, perceived Banyamulenge as invaders, squatters, and intruders who have intruded on their habitats.

On May 2019, approximately 140,000 individuals were forced to leave their homes due to fighting between armed groups in Minembwe, according to humanitarian organizations.

In September 2020, the locality of Minembwe obtained the status of rural commune in the territory of Fizi under conditions qualified as illicit by the other ethnic groups of the region because a specific legal and administrative procedure should be respected. The installation of Minembwe as a rural commune in the Fizi territory, as well as the official installation of its mayor Gad Mukiza (a Tutsi), on September 28, aroused many adverse reactions from other Congolese tribes who claim to own land.

On October 6, 2020, the Mai-Mai gunmen killed Bonaventure Kinyegeria and stole his cattle near Minembwe in the eastern part of the Democratic Republic of the Congo.

On October 8, 2020, the process of creating Minembwe as a rural commune was finally canceled following a declaration by the President of the Republic, Félix Tshisekedi.

Félix Tshisekedi stated:“For me, the salvation of the people is the supreme law. I cannot leave my people in danger. I have decided to cancel what has been done so far for Minembwe”.The Head of State also announced the establishment of a commission of non-native scientific experts with the mission of tracing all the limits of the territory of Fizi, in South Kivu.

On July 20, 2021, Twirwaneho militiamen and its allies attacked the Musika village, located in the southern Basimunyaka Groupement, Lulenge sector. According to several testimonies, fifteen homes of civilians were scorched, forcing civilian members of the local community to move to Runundu and Ilundu villages. Other members of the local communities were also affected and moved toward the villages of Lumanya and Kwamulima. Two elderly men were burned in the house, the children were separated from their parents and a hundred cows were abducted, according to witnesses in the area.  

On May 2022, clashes between Ngumino and Mai-Mai Biloze Bishambuke and their allies killed nearly five people in Irumba and Ngandura, villages situated 15 kilometers from Minembwe.

On July 2022, 4 civilians were killed in Minembwe by Twirwaneho, an insurgent group led by an army deserter Colonel Michel Rukunda, after refusing to join the forced recruitment.

On August 2022, dozens of civilians and police officers were taken hostage by Twirwaneho in the highlands of Minembwe, South Kivu.

On January 4, 2023, the Deputy Chief of Staff of the Armed Forces of the Democratic Republic of the Congo (FARDC) in charge of operations, General-Major Chico Tshitambwe, called on the population of Minembwe to dissociate themselves from armed groups. Chico Tshitambwe also invited the militias to lay down their arms and join the PDDRC-S program.

References

Populated places in South Kivu